T4 was a seagoing torpedo boat operated by the Royal Yugoslav Navy between 1921 and 1932, after spending World War I in Austro-Hungarian Navy service. Originally 79 T, she was a 250t-class torpedo boat, and was laid down on 1 December 1913, launched on 30 April 1914 and completed on 30 September of that year. She saw active service during World War I, performing convoy, patrol, escort and minesweeping tasks, anti-submarine operations and shore bombardment missions. Following Austria-Hungary's defeat in 1918, 79 T was allocated to the Navy of the Kingdom of Serbs, Croats and Slovenes, which later became the Royal Yugoslav Navy, and was renamed T4. At the time, she and the seven other 250t-class boats were the only modern sea-going vessels of the fledgling maritime force. During the interwar period, T4 and the rest of the navy were involved in training exercises and cruises to friendly ports, but activity was limited by reduced naval budgets. In 1932, she ran aground on the Dalmatian coast and became a total loss.

Background
In 1910, the Austria-Hungary Naval Technical Committee initiated the design and development of a  coastal torpedo boat, specifying that it should be capable of sustaining  for 10 hours. This specification was based an expectation that the Strait of Otranto, where the Adriatic Sea meets the Ionian Sea, would be blockaded by hostile forces during a future conflict. In such circumstances, there would be a need for a torpedo boat that could sail from the Austro-Hungarian Navy base at the Bay of Kotor to the Strait during darkness, locate and attack blockading ships and return to port before morning. Steam turbine power was selected for propulsion, as diesels with the necessary power were not available, and the Austro-Hungarian Navy did not have the practical experience to run turbo-electric boats.  (STT) of Trieste was selected for the contract to build eight vessels, ahead of one other tenderer. The T-group designation signified that they were built at Trieste. 79 T was the sixth of its class to be completed.

Description and construction
The crew consisted of 39 officers and enlisted men. The boats were powered by two Parsons steam turbines driving two propellers, using steam generated by two Yarrow water-tube boilers, one of which burned fuel oil and the other coal. The T-group had one funnel rather than the two funnels of the later groups of the class. Due to inadequate funding of her class, 79 T and the rest of the 250t class were essentially coastal vessels, despite the original intention that they would be used for "high seas" operations. The 250t-class T-group were the first small Austro-Hungarian Navy boats to use turbines, and this contributed to ongoing problems with them.

The boats were originally to be armed with three Škoda  L/30 guns, and three  torpedo tubes, but this was changed to two guns and four torpedo tubes before the first boat was completed, in order to standardise the armament with the following F-group. They could also carry 10–12 naval mines.

She was laid down on 1 December 1913, launched on 30 April 1914 and completed on 30 September 1914. In 1914, one  machine gun was added.

Career

World War I
During World War I, 79 T was used for convoy, patrol, escort and minesweeping tasks, anti-submarine operations, and shore bombardment missions. On 24 May 1915, 79 T and seven other 250t-class boats participated in the Bombardment of Ancona, which involved shelling of various Italian shore-based targets, with 79 T involved in the shelling of Porto Corsini near Ravenna. During that action, an Italian  shore battery returned fire, hitting the light cruiser  and damaging one of the other 250t-class boats. In late November 1915, the Austro-Hungarian fleet deployed a force from its main fleet base at Pola to Cattaro in the southern Adriatic; this force included six of the eight T-group torpedo boats, so it is possible that one of these was 79 T. This force was tasked to maintain a permanent patrol of the Albanian coastline and interdict any troop transports crossing from Italy.

Orjen sank one drifter, but once the alarm had been raised, the Austro-Hungarian force withdrew.

In 1917, one of 79 T'''s 66 mm guns was placed on an anti-aircraft mount. On 28 November, a number of 250t-class boats were involved in two shore bombardment missions. In the first mission, 79 T and two other 250t-class boats supported the bombardment of Senigallia by three destroyers, before they were joined by five more 250t-class boats and another three destroyers for the bombardment of Porto Corsini, Marotta and Cesenatico. On 10 June 1918, 79 T and another five 250t-class boats were part of the escort force that failed to protect the Austro-Hungarian dreadnought  from the Italian MAS boats that sank her.

Interwar period
She survived the war intact. In 1920, under the terms of the previous year's Treaty of Saint-Germain-en-Laye by which rump Austria officially ended World War I, she was allocated to the Kingdom of Serbs, Croats and Slovenes (KSCS, later Yugoslavia). Along with three other 250t-class T-group boats, 76 T, 77 T and 78 T, and four 250t-class F-group boats, she served with the Royal Yugoslav Navy (KJRM). Taken over in March 1921, in KJRM service, 79 T was renamed T4. At the outset, she and the other seven 250t-class boats were the only modern sea-going vessels in the KJRM. In 1925, exercises were conducted off the Dalmatian coast, involving the majority of the navy. It is not clear if T4 was one of the torpedo boats involved. The ships and their crews made a very good impression on the British while visiting Malta. In 1932, the British naval attaché reported that Yugoslav ships engaged in few exercises, manoeuvres or gunnery training due to reduced budgets. In the same year, T4'' ran aground on the Dalmatian coast and became a total loss.

See also
List of ships of the Royal Yugoslav Navy

Notes

Footnotes

References
 
 
 
 
 
 
 
 
 
 
 
 
 
 
 
 

Torpedo boats of the Austro-Hungarian Navy
Torpedo boats of the Royal Yugoslav Navy
World War I torpedo boats of Austria-Hungary
1914 ships
Ships built in Trieste
Maritime incidents in 1932
Shipwrecks in the Adriatic Sea